Herbert Hearne (15 March 1862 – 13 June 1906) was an English professional cricketer. He was born at Chalfont St Giles in Buckinghamshire, the son of William Hearne who was considered a good local cricketer.

He played first-class cricket for Kent County Cricket Club as a fast bowler and right-handed batsman between 1884 and 1886. After being awarded his county cap in 1885 and making 25 appearances for Kent, he was forced the retire from cricket due to injury. He made one appearance for Shropshire County Cricket Club in a non-first-class match in 1893 while club professional for Newbold Royal and also played for Buckinghamshire.  He was a member of the extended Hearne family of cricketers, his brothers J.T.Hearne and Walter Hearne being better known.

Hearne died at Chalfont St Giles in 1906 aged 44.

References

External links 

1862 births
1906 deaths
English cricketers
Kent cricketers